Osnabrück's old town (German: Altstadt) is the historic and original core of the city Osnabrück, it is also called Heger Tor Viertel. Osnabrück is a city in Lower Saxony, Germany, with a population of 166,136 (2013). The old town offers shopping, small cafés, alleys with historical buildings and the most of Osnabrück's sights as for example the cathedral and the town hall.

History

The city was founded 780 by Charlemagne, king of the Franks. Around 800 made Charlemagne the area to the new bishopric and the missionary Wiho became Osnabrück's first bishop. The town walls with its towers from this time are the borders for the old town nowadays.

Osnabrück played an important role in the Thirty Years' War. The war that was mainly fought in central Europe was one of the longest and most destructive conflicts in European history. Initially the war started between Catholics and Protestants, although they were all Christians. As the time and the war drew on the conflict became more general involving most of the great powers in Europe. 
Between May and October 1648 were the peace treaties signed in Osnabrück and Münster. The Peace of Westphalia ended with that the Thirty Years' War and Osnabrück became the city of Peace with many historical artifacts from this time.

Tourism and sights
Osnabrück's old town offers a lot of tourist attractions, many cafés and restaurants with a romantic atmosphere and most of Osnabrück's historical sights. Following a selected list of Osnabrück's landmarks.

Cathedral
As the cathedral church of the bishopric Osnabrück the Sankt Peter cathedral has a huge historical impact on the city. The cathedral was first ordained 785 by Bishop Agilfred from Lüttich. But the church had to be rebuilt twice. The second one was destroyed by a devastating fire in 1100. During renovation work from 1218 to 1277 the cathedral got his shape it has until today. The cathedral has two towers. The slimmer one, the northwest tower counts to the most beautiful towers of the Romance time because of his round window line. The other tower was replaced in the 15th century by a bigger late Gothic tower.  Until today the cathedral is opened every day and the mass is held every morning.

Town hall
It took over 25 years to finish the town hall which is located in the central of the old town just next to the Marienkirche. The hall is built in typical Late Gothic style with little towers on the corners and eight statues on the front side of the building. The peace treats for the Thirty Years' War were signed here in 1648 that's why 42 portraits are hung up in the peace hall. These portraits show European envoys and monarchs of those times, even paintings that show the French Sun King Louis XIV and Christina, Queen of Sweden. Additionally the town house provides many historical objects, for example paintings of the former prince-bishops, a copy of the peace treats and model that shows how Osnabrück looked in 1633.

Marienkriche
The church is located just next to the town hall on the market place. In 1543 the church was changed to a Protestant church. From 800 to 850 the church was most likely just used for funerals. In the 13th century to the 15th century the church was extended with to more side aisles and a vault for the choir. But the most impressive is the exterior view. Northern- and southern side are symmetrical designed with four high Gothic windows on each side and four gables. On these gables are statues that are made of sandstone positioned. Between these statues are also gargoyles in the shape of fantasied animals. Moreover, many statues are positioned besides the four big portals.

Heger Tor
The Heger Tor, also called Waterloo Tor is a part of the town walls and could be described as the entrance to the old town. The gate was rebuilt in 1817, two years after the battle of Waterloo in honor of Osnabrück's soldiers that died in that battle. The money for this gate was donated by Gerhard Friedrich von Güllich and designed by Johann Christian Sieckmann. With its shape the gate looks more like a triumphal arch. For tourists it is possible to get on the top of the gate either by using wall ramps or stairs. Standing on top of the gate allows a lovely view on Osnabrück's medieval old town.

Events

Maiwoche

May week (German: Maiwoche) is one of the biggest outdoor town center festivals in Germany. Visitors do not need to pay any entrance fee and the festival includes almost the whole old town and parts of the newer city center. The festival took place the first time in 1972 and is held annually and lasts usually for 9 to 11 days. Through the whole town are stages are stands with food and drinks, decoration or jewelry positioned. In 2007 the 600,000 people visitor border was crossed the first time and the number is increasing every year. The stages are mostly used for music acts. Well known bands like Madsen or Casper have performed their songs during the last years. But the festival also provides the opportunity for unknown bands or artists to be discovered.

Christmas market
The historical Christmas market has a long tradition in Osnabrück. The market is placed in front of the cathedral and on the market place and lasts approximately four week, starting in the end of November and ending just before Christmas. On numerous stands are foods, drinks or decoration sold and small Ferris wheels are built up for children. From 12 to 21 a clock is the market daily opened and warm drinks like hot chocolate or mulled wine are sold to the people.

Picture gallery

References

External links

Altstadt, Heger Tor Viertel
Historischer Weihnachtsmarkt
Maiwoche 2014 Osnabrück
Osnabrücker Land, Tourist information
Theater Osnabrück, Programm
Felix Nussbaum Haus, Museum

Geography of Osnabrück
Tourist attractions in Osnabrück